The list of Bronze Age hoards in Britain comprises significant archaeological hoards of jewellery, precious and scrap metal objects and other valuable items discovered in Great Britain (England, Scotland and Wales) that are associated with the British Bronze Age, approximately 2700 BC to 8th century BC.  It includes both hoards that were buried with the intention of retrieval at a later date (personal hoards, founder's hoards, merchant's hoards, and hoards of loot), and also hoards of votive offerings which were not intended to be recovered at a later date, but excludes grave goods and single items found in isolation.

List of hoards

See also

 List of hoards in Britain
 List of Iron Age hoards in Britain
 List of Roman hoards in Britain

Notes

Footnotes

References
 
 
 
 
 
 
 
 

Archaeology-related lists
Bronze Age Britain
Treasure troves
Lists of hoards in Britain